David A. Lesperance is a United States Army major general who serves as the commanding general of the 2nd Infantry Division since May 18, 2021. Prior to that, he served as commanding general of the Fort Irwin National Training Center from September 2019 to April 2021.

The "Lesperance Landing Pad”, part of the Desert combat area of the National Training Center, is named after Lesperance to commemorate his tenure as commander of the center.

References

Living people
Portland State University alumni
United States Army Command and General Staff College alumni
United States Army War College alumni
Recipients of the Legion of Merit
United States Army generals
Year of birth missing (living people)